New Cross Gate is a railway station in New Cross, London, on the Brighton Main Line and the London Overground. It is in Travelcard Zone 2, and is operated by London Overground.

History

England's railway boom of the 1830s led to two competing companies driving lines through the area. The first, the London and Croydon Railway (L&CR), established a station on New Cross Road close to Hatcham in 1839. The second, the South Eastern Railway (SER), established a station near Amersham Way in the heart of New Cross in 1849. After both stations came under the ownership of the Southern Railway on 1 January 1923 the former L&CR station was renamed New Cross Gate on 9 July 1923.

London and Croydon Railway Station

The original station was officially opened on 1 June 1839 by the London and Croydon Railway. and became fully operational on 5 June 1839. It was intended to become the main freight depot and locomotive workshop for the company. In July 1841 the line (but not the station) was also used by the London and Brighton Railway. The London and Croydon and London and Brighton companies merged to form the London, Brighton and South Coast Railway (LB&SCR) in July 1846. Between February and May 1847 the station at New Cross was the northern terminus of the atmospheric propulsion system introduced by the L&CR, but in the latter month the system was abandoned by the new company.

London Brighton and South Coast Railway Station

On 1 October 1847 the newly formed LB&SCR closed the existing New Cross station, replacing it with another at Cold Blow Lane 0.25 miles to the north, in an attempt to secure passengers from the planned North Kent Line of the SER. This move was not a success and was subject to much local criticism, so on 1 May 1849 the LB&SCR rebuilt and re-opened New Cross on the original site.

The current station therefore dates from 1849 but was again rebuilt in 1858 to allow for the quadrupling of the Brighton Main Line.

The line through the station was electrified in 1928 by the Southern Railway using the third rail system, although the majority of services continued to be steam hauled until the electrification of the Brighton main line in 1932.

East London Railway Station
On 7 December 1869 a separate station for East London Railway services was opened adjacent to the London, Brighton & South Coast Railway station. It was closed on 1 September 1886 when services were diverted to the LB&SCR station. Soon after closure the station was demolished and the land used for sidings.

East London Railway
The East London Railway (ELR) was owned by a consortium of railway companies. Passenger services were operated by the LB&SCR between Croydon and Liverpool Street, and from 1884 by the District Railway between New Cross (Gate) and Shoreditch. LB&SCR services ceased on 31 March 1913, when the line was electrified using the fourth rail system and thereafter all passenger services were operated by the Metropolitan Railway. For the opening of the ELR a separate ELR station was built in 1869 adjacent to the LB&SCR station. It was closed in 1876 and the trains were diverted to the adjacent LB&SCR station. It was reopened in 1884 for additional Metropolitan District Railway services only for it to close two years later. The ELR station was then demolished around 1900 and the site used for sidings.

In 1933 the Metropolitan railway was taken over by the London Passenger Transport Board, which operated services as part of the London Transport Metropolitan line. London Transport was superseded by Transport for London (TfL).

Freight yard
The London and Croydon planned to use New Cross as the London terminal for its freight traffic, as the station had good access to the Grand Surrey Canal. It therefore built extensive sidings for this purpose. After 1849 the principal freight-handling facility in the area was moved to Willow Walk on the Bricklayers Arms site, but the sidings continued to be used for the storage of carriages. An Ordnance Survey map for 1871 shows a substantial carriage shed on the west side of the main line, north of the station, but this was no longer shown on the 1894 map. It had been replaced by a combined carriage and locomotive shed on the east side of the line in 1894, but this closed in 1906.

Cross-London freight services were operated to the yard by the Great Eastern Railway, which maintained its own goods depot on the site from the 1870s. These services were continued by the London and North Eastern Railway from 1923, and after 1948 by the Eastern Region of British Railways. They ceased to operate in 1962.

Locomotive depot and repair workshops
The L&CR opened a motive power depot and a locomotive repair facility here in 1839, the former of which appears to have been particularly accident prone. The original building, one of the earliest roundhouses, burned down in 1844. A replacement was built in 1845, and a straight shed built by the LB&SCR in 1848 was blown down in a gale in October 1863. Two further buildings were constructed by the LB&SCR in 1863 and 1869. By 1882 the second (1845) Croydon shed was derelict and in that year was replaced by the new shed, which was rebuilt with a new roof by the Southern Railway (SR) prior to 1929.

The various running sheds began to be run down during the 1930s as part of a re-organisation scheme involving new developments at Norwood Junction, but the onset of war meant that they were not formally closed until 1947 and were used for stabling locomotives until 1951. They were demolished in 1957 together with the repair workshops, and replaced by sidings for the storage of electric multiple units.

The locomotive workshops established by the L&CR continued to undertake minor repairs on locomotives in the London area for the LB&SCR and the SR, and also briefly for British Railways. They were closed in 1949.

London Overground
The East London Line closed on 22 December 2007 and reopened on 27 April 2010 as part of the new London Overground system. The service was also closed between 1995 and 1998 due to repair work on the tunnel under the River Thames. The East London line extension included a flyover north of New Cross Gate allowing trains to run through from West Croydon, plus the construction of a train servicing facility nearby. Platform 1 and adjacent track (southbound) were refurbished, with the line continuing under New Cross Road, before merging with the down slow line. LO services terminated here until 23 May 2010 when services were extended south. Ticket barriers were installed to all platforms in time for the London Overground services to commence.

Bakerloo line extension
TFL has proposed future London Underground services at this station as part of the Bakerloo line Extension. TFL claim that if funding is correct, construction would start in 2023 and services would start running in 2028/29.

Services
Services at New Cross Gate are operated by Southern and London Overground using  and  EMUs.

The typical off-peak service in trains per hour is:
 2 tph to 
 8 tph to  via 
 2 tph to  via 
 4 tph to 
 4 tph to 

Platform layout
The layout is:
Platform 3 and 4 are not usually used

Thameslink trains and other Southern services regularly pass through and occasionally stop at the station.

Connections
London Buses routes 21, 53, 136, 171, 172, 177, 321, 436, 453 and night routes N21, N53, N89, N136 and N171 serve the station.

Accident
On 7 August 1899 a train hauled by "Terrier" No.59 Cheam collided with "Gladstone" No. 199 Samuel Laing after the driver overran signals approaching the station. Fifteen people were injured.

References

External links

Railway stations served by London Overground
Railway stations in the London Borough of Lewisham
DfT Category C1 stations
Former London, Brighton and South Coast Railway stations
Former East London Railway stations
Railway stations in Great Britain opened in 1839
Railway workshops in Great Britain
New Cross
1839 establishments in England
London Overground Night Overground stations
Railway stations served by Govia Thameslink Railway